Amazon most often refers to:

 Amazon River, in South America
 Amazon rainforest, a rainforest covering most of the Amazon basin
 Amazon (company), an American multinational technology company
 Amazons, a tribe of female warriors in Greek mythology

Amazon or Amazone may also refer to:

Places

South America 
 Amazon Basin (sedimentary basin), a sedimentary basin at the middle and lower course of the river
 Amazon basin, the part of South America drained by the river and its tributaries
 Amazon Reef, at the mouth of the Amazon basin

Elsewhere 
 1042 Amazone, an asteroid
 Amazon Creek, a stream in Oregon, US

People 
 Amazon Eve (born 1979), American model, fitness trainer, and actress
 Lesa Lewis (born 1967), American professional bodybuilder nicknamed "Amazon"

Art and entertainment

Fictional characters 
 Amazon (Amalgam Comics)
 Amazon, an alias of the Marvel supervillain Man-Killer
 Amazons (DC Comics), a group of superhuman characters
 The Amazon, a Diablo II character
 The Amazon, a Pro Wrestling character
 Kamen Rider Amazon, title character in the fourth installment of the Kamen Rider series

Film and television 

 The Amazons (1917 film), an American silent tragedy
 The Amazon (film), a 1921 German silent film
 War Goddess, also known as The Amazons, a 1973 Italian adventure fantasy drama
 Amazons (1984 film), an American thriller
 Amazons (1986 film), an Argentine adventure fantasy
 Amazon (1990 film), a 1990 drama
 Amazon (1997 film), a short documentary
 Amazon (1999 TV series), a Canadian drama
 Amazon (2000 film), a 2000 French film
 Amazon (2008 TV series), a British documentary series

Games 
 Amazon (chess), a fairy chess piece
 Amazons (solitaire), a card game
 Amazon (video game), a 1984 interactive fiction graphic adventure game
 Amazon: Guardians of Eden, a 1991 video game
 Game of the Amazons, a board game

Literature 
 Amazons (novel), a 1980 novel co-written by Don DeLillo, published under the pseudonym Cleo Birdwell
 Amazons!, a fantasy anthology edited by Jessica Amanda Salmonson
 Swallows and Amazons series, a series of twelve children's books by Arthur Ransome
 The Amazon (novella), by Nikolai Leskov
 The Amazons (play), by Arthur Wing Pinero

Music 
 The Amazons (band), a British indie band from Reading, Berkshire

Military units 
 Amazonian Guard, or "the Amazons", a bodyguard unit of Muammar Gaddafi
 Amazons Company, a Greek ceremonial female battalion
 Dahomey Amazons, a Fon regiment

Organizations 
 Amazon Bookstore Cooperative, a former feminist bookstore
 Amazonen-Werke, a German agricultural machinery manufacturer
 Los Angeles Amazons, an American football team
 Takembeng, or les Amazones des SDF, a women's social movement in Cameroon

Transportation

Land vehicles 
 Amazon (automobile), a 1920s British cyclecar
 Amazon, a GWR 3031 Class locomotive operating 1892–1908
 Amazon, a GWR Iron Duke Class locomotive operating 1851–1877
 Volvo Amazon, a 1956–1970 mid-size car

Ships 
 Amazon (1780 ship), launched in France in 1775 under another name
 Amazon (brigantine), a Canadian brigantine launched 1861
 Amazon (yacht), a British screw schooner built 1885
 Amazon-class frigate, four classes of frigate of the British Royal Navy
 Amazon-class sloop, of the British Royal Navy
 French submarine Amazone (1916), an Armide-class diesel-electric attack submarine
 HMS Amazon, nine ships of the Royal Navy
 RMS Amazon, two ships of the Royal Mail Steam Packet Company
 SMS Amazone (1843), a 3-masted sail corvette of the Prussian Navy
 SMS Amazone, a 1900 2,700 ton Gazelle-class light cruiser
 USS Amazon (1861), a US Navy bark

Other uses 
 Amazon (color), a variant of jungle green
 Amazon parrot

See also 
 
 
 Amason (disambiguation)
 Amazonas (disambiguation)
 Amazonia (disambiguation)
 Amazonian (disambiguation)
 Amazonka, a 2008 album by Ruslana
 Amyzon (disambiguation)
 Amazonis Planitia